The Come Around Sundown World Tour was the second concert tour by American rock band Kings of Leon. Visiting the Americas, Europe, Africa and Australia, the tour supported the band's fifth studio album, Come Around Sundown (2010). The tour has been praised by both critics and spectators alike, with many dates selling out within minutes. The concerts held in North America (in 2010) grossed over 14 million dollars, becoming the 49th highest-grossing North American tour. The tour ranked 40th in Pollstar's "Top 50 Worldwide Tour (Mid-Year)", earning roughly 20 million dollars in 2011.

Background
After finishing their previous tour, the band began working on their fifth studio album. In a 2009 interview with Billboard, frontman Caleb Followill stated the album would have a similar sound to their debut album, with a chill vibe. After the announcement of the album, the band later announced they would be a headlining act at the 2010 Bonnaroo Music Festival. The tour was officially announced via the band's official website in April 2010. The album was not due for release until October 2010 and the band was hesitant to showcase the new music to the public. However, they all felt that their fans did not want a continuation of their last tour. They further elaborated, "I think if we were to go out there, play a concert right now and not play some new music, it would feel like we had our hands tied and I think we would be bored with the show. We didn't want to go back out there and give them 'Only By the Night Tour' Part 2. It's inspiring to us to be able to go out there and play a new song. ... If we were going out there and not playing these songs, I don't think that we would have the spark and the smile on our face that we do at this point."

The tour proved to be successful in all regions, especially in Europe where the band sold out concerts within minutes and embarked on their first stadium tour in the region. However, the tour faced a few hiccups along the way. The tour made media headlines in July 2010 when the band cancelled a concert at the Verizon Wireless Amphitheater in Maryland Heights, Missouri after experiencing substantial amounts of fecal matter from pigeons. Additional headlines were when the band's tour bus caught on fire at the loading dock for The O2 Arena in London, England. The Australian leg of the tour has been postponed until November 2011 to allow drummer Nathan Followill to recover after surgery for a torn right labrum and biceps.

Opening acts

The Whigs (North America—Leg 2 & June 2010) (Europe—Leg 1, select dates)
The Black Keys (North America—Leg 2)
The Drums (London—June 2010)
The Features (London—June 2010) (North America—Leg 1, select dates)
Built to Spill (North America—Leg 1)
The Stills (North America—Leg 1, select dates)
Manchester Orchestra (New York City—November 2010) 
Band of Horses (North America—April 2011, Australia)
Paul Weller (Hyde Park—June 2011) 
Zac Brown Band (Europe—Leg 2, select dates)
Thin Lizzy (Slane Castle)
Elbow (Slane Castle)
White Lies (Europe—Leg 2, select dates)
Mona (Europe—Leg 2, select dates)
The Whigs (Slane Castle & The O2 Arena, London)
The Walkmen (Europe—Leg 2, select dates)

Setlist

Tour dates

Festivals and other miscellaneous performances

Cancellations and rescheduled shows

Box office score data

Critical reception
Kevin Courtney (The Irish Times) praised the performance at The O2 stating the band was ready to play stadiums. He further remarked, "[…] this was a southern rock version of U2, delivering big anthems with a twang, and lassoing the audience with well-aimed riffs and chant-along choruses". On the contrary, Ed Power (The Daily Telegraph) gave the same concert two out of five stars stating, "Today, any whiff of the exotic is thoroughly dissipated. Shrugging off last summer's Spinal Tap-like 'pigeongate' debacle (they cut short an outdoor US performance after bird droppings starting raining down from the rafters) Kings of Leon came to Dublin in the straightforward guise of stadium-filling mega-band".
David Dunn (Sheffield Star) stated the band was very lucky after viewing the concert at the Motorpoint Arena. He continued to write "[…] and their many other musical lightning strikes is the same: glee, euphoria, unwavering adoration". James Watkins (Shropshire Star) thought highly of the performance at the National Indoor Arena. He wrote, "Highlight of the night was the spine-tingling and epic Pyro, that saw mobile phones held in the air to light up the whole arena in a 4-minute moment of pure magic".

External links
Official Website

References 

2010 concert tours
2011 concert tours
Kings of Leon